Aktogay may refer to following localities in Kazakhstan:
 Aktogay District, Karaganda Region
 Its centre, Aktogay, Karaganda Region, a selo
 Aktogay District, Pavlodar Province
 Its centre, Aktogay, Pavlodar Province, a village
 Aktogay, East Kazakhstan Province, an urban-type settlement and railway junction
 Aktogay, Almaty Province, a village
 Aktogay, Atyrau Province, a village
 Aktogay, Sarysu District, Jambyl Province, a village